The Merger Treaty, also known as the Treaty of Brussels, was a European treaty which unified the executive institutions of the European Coal and Steel Community (ECSC), European Atomic Energy Community (Euratom) and the European Economic Community (EEC). The treaty was signed in Brussels on 8 April 1965 and came into force on 1 July 1967. It set out that the Commission of the European Communities should replace the High Authority of the ECSC, the Commission of the EEC and the Commission of Euratom, and that the Council of the European Communities should replace the Special Council of Ministers of the ECSC, the Council of the EEC and the Council of Euratom. Although each Community remained legally independent, they shared common institutions (prior to this treaty, they already shared a Parliamentary Assembly and Court of Justice) and were together known as the European Communities. This treaty is regarded by some as the real beginning of the modern European Union.

This treaty was abrogated by the Amsterdam Treaty signed in 1997:

Structural evolution of the European Commission

EU evolution timeline

References

External links 
 Merger Treaty European NAvigator

Treaties amending the founding treaties of the European Union
1965 in the European Economic Community
1967 in the European Economic Community
Treaties concluded in 1965
Treaties entered into force in 1967
European Atomic Energy Community
1965 in economics
1967 in economics
1965 in international relations
1960s in Brussels
Events in Brussels
Euro
April 1965 events in Europe